Matthew Lister (born 1992) is a British slalom canoeist who competed at the international level from 2008 to 2015, predominantly in the C2 class with Rhys Davies.

He won two bronze medals in the C2 team event at the ICF Canoe Slalom World Championships, earning them in 2011 and 2013.

Lister came out as gay in 2012. In 2016, he announced his retirement from competitive sport. He currently writes a fitness column for Attitude magazine, and occasionally works as a model, including advertising campaigns in 2017 for Rowse Honey and Moss Brothers suits. In October 2019, he appeared in RuPaul's Drag Race UK as a member of the "Brit Crew". He is also an LGBT ambassador for the British Athletes Commission.

References

1992 births
Living people
British male canoeists
Gay sportsmen
LGBT canoeists
English LGBT sportspeople
Medalists at the ICF Canoe Slalom World Championships
Sportspeople from Preston, Lancashire